Saint Munditia (or Mundita) is venerated as a Christian martyr.

Relics 
Her relics are found in a side altar at St. Peter's Church (known as "Old Peter," ) in Munich. They consist of a gilt-covered and gem-studded skeleton, located in a glass case, with false eyes in her skull, which is wrapped in netting. Jewels cover the mouth of the relic's rotten teeth.

Inscription 
The inscription on the stone slab that originally sealed the arcosolium in the catacombs and that is now located below the head of the skeleton reads:

The meaning of "" is unclear. The Roman document of authenticity states that it means "" ("beheaded with a hatchet"), describing the manner of her martyrdom. "" may also refer to: "", referring to the fact that she died during the consulate of Andronicus and Probus, thus making her date of death 310 CE.

History 
Her relics were translated to Munich from Rome in 1675 from the catacombs of Cyriaca. They were transferred to her Baroque Era-shrine which was consecrated on September 5, 1677. In 1804, her relics were concealed behind a wooden shrine, but this was removed in 1883, restoring interest in her cult. Her feast day is now celebrated annually with a High Mass and a procession with candles.

Cultural references 
Vahni Capildeo's poem, called "Saint Munditia", is found in their collection No Traveller Returns, in which they describe the saint as being "dug up from her burial / a millennium and a third since the flesh fell off her. / She's back in church."

References

External links 
  Die heilige Munditia
  Munditia "Protogenia"

Saints from Roman Italy
People from Munich
Culture of Altbayern
4th-century Christian martyrs
4th-century Roman women
Year of birth unknown